The Elektronika MK-18M was a scientific calculator manufactured in the Soviet Union. It was released in 1986.

Technical specifications
Display: fluorescent, green color, contains 8 digits + minus sign + error sign
Power: 4 x AA batteries or AC adapter (with charging function) with 3-pin connector, power consumption ≤0.7W 
20 buttons
Case: aluminium + plastic
Supported numbers range: ±(10E-7)...±(10E8-1)
Size: 170x86.5x27 mm, weighing around 350 grams
Ambient temperature range: +10...+35 °C

See also
Elektronika B3-34
Computer-related introductions in 1986
Elektronika calculators